Tarmi Sport Club, is an Iraqi football team based in Tel Afar District, Nineveh, that plays in Iraq Division Two.

Managerial history
 Mustafa Haded

See also 
 2020–21 Iraq FA Cup
 2021–22 Iraq FA Cup

References

External links
 Tarmi SC on Goalzz.com
 Iraq Clubs- Foundation Dates

2019 establishments in Iraq
Association football clubs established in 2019
Football clubs in Nineveh